Ghost River is a locality and unincorporated place on the Albany River at the mouth of the Cheepay River in the Unorganized North Part of Cochrane District in northeastern Ontario, Canada. It is on the border with Kenora District.

References

Communities in Cochrane District